Maurice Wilfred Goding (September 21, 1911 – September 14, 1998) was an American lawyer and government official. He served as High Commissioner for the  Trust Territory of the Pacific Islands from May 1, 1961, to May 27, 1966.

Life and career
Goding was born in Skagway, Alaska. He graduated from Yankton College in South Dakota  in 1933. In the 1930s, he taught public school in South Dakota and Alaska and served as an inspector  for the U.S. Customs Service in Alaska. He served  on  staff for Congressman A.J. Dimond from 1940 to 1942.  During World War II he served on the Board of Economic Warfare. In 1944 he was appointed Assistant Chief (and Acting Chief) Alaska Branch, Division of Territories and Island  Possessions, for the Office of the Secretary of the United States Department of the Interior. He became involved in further development of American interests in the Pacific after the war.

Goding earned a law degree from George Washington University in 1950. He continued in staff positions with the Department of the Interior until he was appointed United States  High  Commissioner,  Trust  Territory of the Pacific Islands by President John F. Kennedy. His work focused on developing education, transportation, and  a new central legislative body, the Congress of Micronesia.

Goding retired in 1966 and received an honorary Doctors of Laws degree from the University of Alaska in 1968. He later moved to Stuttgart, Arkansas, where he died of pneumonia in 1998.

References

1911 births
1998 deaths
Deaths from pneumonia in Arkansas
George Washington University Law School alumni
High Commissioners of the Trust Territory of the Pacific Islands
People from the Municipality of Skagway Borough, Alaska
People of the Alaska Territory
Yankton College alumni
People from Stuttgart, Arkansas
United States Customs Service personnel